A list of events which happened in 1268 in Italy:

Events
 Battle of Tagliacozzo
 Papal election, 1268–71

Births
 Agnes of Montepulciano
 Clare of Montefalco
 Ludovico I Gonzaga

Deaths
 Pope Clement IV
 Barral of Baux
 Reniero Zeno

Italy
Italy
Years of the 13th century in Italy